Cook's Tour and similar may refer to:
 Cook's Tour, a nickname for tours of Thomas Cook
 "Cook's Tour", an episode of Silk Stalkings
 "Cook's Tour", an episode of Emergency!
 A Cook's Tour (book), a book by Anthony Bourdain
 A Cook's Tour (TV series)

See also 
 Kook's Tour, a 1970 film